Paulina Creek Falls is a cascade and plunge waterfall from a streambed draining from Paulina Lake in Newberry National Volcanic Monument, south of Bend, Oregon. The waterfall is notable for its side-by-side drop of  that surrounds a small island at the edge of the cliff.

Trails
A paved foot out and back trail leads to Paulina Falls starting at the trailhead located at the Paulina Falls Day Use Area off Paulina Lake Road (Hw 21). The trail leads to the bottom and the top of the waterfall. Road 21 into Newberry Caldera with access to Monument summer trails is closed in the winter due to snow.

See also 

 List of waterfalls in Oregon

References

External links
 

Newberry National Volcanic Monument
Plunge waterfalls
Waterfalls of Deschutes County, Oregon